Fashion Central is an online fashion magazine based in  Lahore, Pakistan covering events in Pakistani Fashion Industry. The name Fashion Central comes from the idea of providing a central portal for all fashion-related affairs in Pakistan. The magazine won the PASHA ICT Award in 2010.

History
Founded in 2007, Fashion Central was initially launched as an online Ecommerce portal. After about 6 months the website was totally revamped and was reinvented as an online fashion and lifestyle magazine. In early 2011 the website added ecommerce as one of its services. The products being offered include apparel, perfumes, lifestyle items, and other fashion and lifestyle-related accessories. Delivery options are available for countries across the globe with multiple payment options. The products on sale at FashionCentral are directly sourced from known designers.

Main categories
The main categories are Pakistani fashion designers, models, stylists, photographers, fashion events, trends and lifestyle. Subcategories include health, beauty, parenting, fashion accessories, food and home décor.

References

External links

2007 establishments in Pakistan
Fashion magazines
Magazines established in 2007
Mass media in Lahore
Pakistani fashion
Online magazines published in Pakistan
English-language magazines published in Pakistan
Women's fashion magazines